Charles Gardner (December 8, 1814 – February 21, 1892) was a politician from Minnesota Territory and a former member of the Minnesota Territory House of Representatives, representing Cottage Grove, Minnesota. Gardner served as Speaker of the Minnesota Territory House of Representatives in 1856.

References

1814 births
1892 deaths
Members of the Minnesota Territorial Legislature
19th-century American politicians
People from Mantorville, Minnesota
People from Cottage Grove, Minnesota